Ledine is a village in the hills east of Spodnja Idrija in the Municipality of Idrija in the traditional Inner Carniola region of Slovenia.

Church

The parish church in the settlement is dedicated to Saint James and belongs to the Koper Diocese.

References

External links

Ledine on Geopedia

Populated places in the Municipality of Idrija